Weddin may refer to:
Weddin Mountains National Park
Weddin Shire

See also
Wedding